The 1980 Scottish League Cup final was played on 6 December 1980, at Dens Park in Dundee and was the final of the 35th Scottish League Cup competition. The final was a Dundee derby contested by Dundee United and Dundee. Dundee United won the match 3–0 thanks to goals by Davie Dodds and Paul Sturrock (2). This was United's second senior trophy victory following success the previous season in the same tournament. Dundee's Billy Williamson was playing against his previous club.

Background
In the build up to the match The Glasgow Herald writer Jim Reynolds stated that he could not recall a major final in Scotland, including those contested by the Old Firm, which had attracted so much interest. Describing Dundee as the "football capital of Scotland" for the day of the match, Reynolds noted that the match had some features of a David vs Goliath struggle, albeit one with a difference as the two teams fortunes seemed to have switched over the previous few years. United who were the holders of the trophy had traditionally been the weaker side in Dundee, but were enjoying a period of success. By contrast, Dundee had for most of their history been the more successful club, but were now no longer in the top flight. This made United favourites with bookmakers and Reynolds also expected them to win.

Match details

References

External links
 Soccerbase

1980
League Cup Final
Dundee F.C. matches
Dundee United F.C. matches
20th century in Dundee
Sports competitions in Dundee
December 1980 sports events in the United Kingdom
Football in Dundee